Franklin Avenue is a street in Los Angeles. It is the northernmost thoroughfare in Hollywood, north of Hollywood Boulevard, and the southern border of the Hollywood Hills. It is the center of the neighborhood of Franklin Village.

Franklin Avenue begins as a residential street off Sierra Bonita Avenue. Continuing east, Franklin is the southern border of Whitley Heights, and turns into a major east–west thoroughfare in the Hollywood Hills. Franklin Avenue ends in Los Feliz.

Landmarks and neighborhoods

Listing landmarks from west to east on Franklin, The Magic Castle is furthest west.  The first house in the Hollywood area, built by Tomás Urquidez in 1854, was at the intersection of what would become Franklin Avenue and Outpost Drive.  The corner of Franklin and Gower Street is cited as one of the better places to photograph the Hollywood Sign.

The Château Élysée, a former residential apartment house for movie stars (now the Church of Scientology Celebrity Centre) is located in the Franklin Village neighborhood, as is The Upright Citizens Brigade Theatre. The Shakespeare Bridge is located further east, near the intersection of Franklin with St. George Street in the Franklin Hills area of the Los Feliz district of Los Angeles.

References

Streets in Los Angeles
Streets in Hollywood, Los Angeles
East Hollywood, Los Angeles
Los Feliz, Los Angeles